Eden were an Israeli vocal group active between 1996 and 2001, consisting of Doron Oren, Rafael Dahan and brothers Gabriel and Eddie Butler.  They are known primarily for their participation in the 1999 Eurovision Song Contest.

Eden were chosen by internal selection to represent Israel in the 1999 Eurovision Song Contest with the song "Yom Huledet (Happy Birthday)".  As a result of Dana International's Eurovision victory the previous year, the 1999 contest was held on their home ground in Jerusalem on 29 May, when "Yom Huledet (Birthday)" finished in a respectable fifth place of the 23 entries. Eden also recorded several music tracks for the Italian albums "The Long Road: Grandi Classici Per Viaggiare" and "California: The Best of West Coast Music Vol. 2" released in 2005. The group were not able to capitalise on their Eurovision appearance, and disbanded in 2001.  Member Eddie Butler went on to represent Israel as a solo artist in the Eurovision Song Contest 2006.

References 

 

Eurovision Song Contest entrants for Israel
Eurovision Song Contest entrants of 1999
Israeli pop music groups
Musical groups established in 1996